Tramp is the third album by American singer–songwriter Sharon Van Etten, released on February 7, 2012.

For the recording, Sharon collaborated with Zach Condon, Wye Oak’s Jenn Wasner, Julianna Barwick, Walkmen's Matt Barrick, Thomas Bartlett, and Aaron Dessner. Dessner also produced the album and provided the studio.

The first track to be released as a single was "Serpents", featuring Aaron and Bryce Dessner, Barwick, Wasner, and Bartlett.

Reception

At Metacritic, which assigns a normalised rating out of 100 to reviews from mainstream critics, Tramp received an average score of 81, based on 31 reviews, indicating "universal acclaim". Reviewer Thom Jurek of AllMusic said that although the album contained "great beauty", Van Etten "skirts the edges of giving us a great album without actually delivering one" and noted that "Tramp doesn't quite fulfill its considerable promise."

Tramp debuted at number 75 on the Billboard 200.

The album was listed 42nd on Stereogum's list of top 50 albums of 2012.

Track listing
All songs written by Sharon Van Etten.

Musicians
 Sharon Van Etten - Vocals (1-12), Guitar (1-7,10-12), Harmonium (5,10), Ukulele (8), Organ (9)
 Matt Barrick - Drums (1,3,5,6,8,9)
 Thomas Bartlett - Keys (3,12), Rhodes (6), Piano (8,10)
 Julianna Barwick - Vocals (4,11)
 Logan Coale - Double Bass (5)
 Zach Condon - Vocals (8,9)
 Aaron Dessner - Guitar (1,2,5,7,10,12), Bass (1,3,4,7,8,10,11), Keys (1,4,7-9,11,12), Drums (2,10), Slide Guitar (3), Electric Guitar (4,8), Drum Machine (4), Piano (5,7,9), Shaker (5), Guitar Feedback (11), Glockenspiel (11), Percussion (11), Orchestration (12)
 Bryce Dessner - Ebo Guitar (3,11), Bowed Guitar (7), Orchestration (7,8,12)
 Bryan Devendorf - Drums (7,10)
 Clarice Jensen - Cello (8,12)
 Doug Keith - Bass (6), Guitar (7)
 Benjamin Lanz - Trombone (7,11)
 Ben Lord - Drums (11)
 Rob Moose - Violin (5,8,12), Orchestration (5), Mandolin (5), Viola (8)
 Jenn Wasner - Vocals (3,6)

References

Sharon Van Etten albums
2012 albums
Albums produced by Aaron Dessner
Jagjaguwar albums